Angelo Craig (born September 5, 1985) is a former gridiron football defensive end. He most recently played for the Hamilton Tiger-Cats of the Canadian Football League. He was drafted by the Cincinnati Bengals in the seventh round of the 2008 NFL Draft. He played college football at Cincinnati.

Craig has also been a member of the Carolina Panthers and New England Patriots.

Professional career

Cincinnati Bengals
Craig was drafted by the Bengals with the 244th overall selection in the seventh round of the 2008 NFL Draft. He was waived on August 30, 2008.

Carolina Panthers
Craig was signed to the Carolina Panthers' practice squad on September 1, 2008, but was waived from it on September 4, 2008.

New England Patriots
Craig was signed to the New England Patriots' practice squad on December 3, 2008. He was released on June 4, 2009.

Hamilton Tiger-Cats
On October 18, 2011, Craig signed with the Hamilton Tiger-Cats. He was released on May 9, 2012.

External links
Cincinnati Bearcats bio
New England Patriots bio

1985 births
Living people
Players of American football from Ohio
American football defensive ends
American football linebackers
Cincinnati Bearcats football players
Cincinnati Bengals players
Carolina Panthers players
New England Patriots players
Green Bay Blizzard players
Hamilton Tiger-Cats players